The Roman Catholic Diocese of Kumbakonam is a diocese located in the city of Kumbakonam in the Ecclesiastical province of Pondicherry and Cuddalore in India.

History
 1 September 1899: Established as Diocese of Kumbakonam from the Metropolitan Archdiocese of Pondicherry

Special churches
Minor Basilicas:
Basilica of Our Lady of Lourdes, Poondi

Leadership
 Bishops of Kumbakonam (Latin Rite)
 Bishop Francis Antonysamy (31 May 2008 – 06-12-2021)
 Bishop Peter Remigius (10 November 1989 – 30 June 2007)
 Bishop Daniel Paul Arulswamy (5 May 1955 – 16 August 1988)
 Bishop Peter Francis Rayappa (24 February 1931 – 20 September 1954)
 Bishop Marie-Augustine Chapuis, M.E.P. (21 May 1913 – 17 December 1928)
 Bishop Hugues-Madelain Bottero, M.E.P. (5 September 1899 – 21 May 1913)

Saints and causes for canonisation
 Servant of God Fr. Lourdu Xavier Savarirayan
 Servant of God Fr. John Peter Savarinayagam, OFM. Cap.

References

External links

 GCatholic.org 
 Catholic Hierarchy 

Roman Catholic dioceses in India
Religious organizations established in 1899
Roman Catholic dioceses and prelatures established in the 19th century
Christianity in Tamil Nadu